Park Hill is a historic house at 400 East Wahl Street in Paris, Arkansas.  It is a large two-story brick building, with Mediterranean style.  It has a red tile hip roof, with a three-bay porch projecting from its five-bay facade, and a porte cochere on the west side.  The house was built in 1929-30 as a wedding present from Charles Wahl to his wife, and was designed by Bassham and Wheeler of Fort Smith, Arkansas.  It is a distinctive local example of the Mediterranean Revival style.

The house was listed on the National Register of Historic Places in 2013.

See also
National Register of Historic Places listings in Logan County, Arkansas

References

Houses on the National Register of Historic Places in Arkansas
National Register of Historic Places in Logan County, Arkansas
Houses completed in 1930
Houses in Logan County, Arkansas
Buildings and structures in Paris, Arkansas